Kevin Scott may refer to:
 Kevin Scott (speed skater) (born 1969), Canadian speed skater
 Kevin Scott (footballer) (born 1966), English footballer
 Kevin Scott (American football) (born 1969), former American football cornerback 
 Kevin Scott (Canadian football) (born 1983), Canadian football long snapper and defensive lineman 
 Kevin Scott (badminton) (born 1965), Scottish badminton player 
 Kevin Scott (computer scientist) (born 1972), Chief Technology Officer at Microsoft 
 Kevin M. Scott (born 1935), American geologist and author